The 1995 CCHA Men's Ice Hockey Tournament was the 24th CCHA Men's Ice Hockey Tournament. It was played between March 9 and March 18, 1995. Opening round play-in and quarterfinal games were played at campus sites, while the Finals play-in and 'final four' games were played at Joe Louis Arena in Detroit, Michigan. By winning the tournament, Lake Superior State received the Central Collegiate Hockey Association's automatic bid to the 1995 NCAA Division I Men's Ice Hockey Tournament.

Format
The tournament featured three rounds of play. The teams that finished tenth and eleventh in the standings played a single play-in game to determine the final qualifier for the playoffs. In the quarterfinals, the first and tenth seeds, the second and ninth seeds, the third seed and eighth seeds, the fourth seed and seventh seeds and the fifth seed and sixth seeds played a best-of-three series, with the winners advancing to the semifinals. The lowest two remaining seeds played a play-in game to determine the last qualifier for the 'final four'. In the semifinals, the remaining highest and lowest seeds and second-highest and second-lowest seeds play a single game, with the winners advancing to the finals. The tournament champion receives an automatic bid to the 1995 NCAA Division I Men's Ice Hockey Tournament.

Conference standings
Note: GP = Games played; W = Wins; L = Losses; T = Ties; PTS = Points; GF = Goals For; GA = Goals Against

Bracket

Note: * denotes overtime period(s)

Play-in

(10) Ohio State vs. (11) Alaska–Fairbanks

Quarterfinals

(1) Michigan vs. (10) Ohio State

(2) Bowling Green vs. (9) Notre Dame

(3) Michigan State vs. (8) Illinois–Chicago

(4) Lake Superior State vs. (7) Western Michigan

(5) Miami vs. (6) Ferris State

Finals Play-in

(4) Lake Superior State vs. (5) Miami

Semifinals

(1) Michigan vs. (4) Lake Superior State

(2) Bowling Green vs. (3) Michigan State

Championship

(3) Michigan State vs. (4) Lake Superior State

Tournament awards

All-Tournament Team
F Jason Trzcinski (Lake Superior State)
F Bates Battaglia (Lake Superior State)
F Wayne Strachan* (Lake Superior State)
D Chris Slater (Michigan State)
D Keith Aldridge (Lake Superior State)
G Mike Buzak (Michigan State)
* Most Valuable Player(s)

References

External links
CCHA Champions
1994–95 CCHA Standings
1994–95 NCAA Standings

CCHA Men's Ice Hockey Tournament
Ccha tournament